NRLMSISE-00 is an empirical, global reference atmospheric model of the Earth from ground to space. It models the temperatures and densities of the atmosphere's components. A primary use of this model is to aid predictions of satellite orbital decay due to atmospheric drag. This model has also been used by astronomers to calculate the mass of air between telescopes and laser beams in order to assess the impact of laser guide stars on the non-lasing telescopes.

Development
The model, developed by Mike Picone, Alan Hedin, and Doug Drob, is based on the earlier models MSIS-86 and MSISE-90, but updated with actual satellite drag data. It also predicts anomalous oxygen.

NRL stands for the US Naval Research Laboratory. MSIS stands for mass spectrometer and incoherent scatter radar, the two primary data sources for development of earlier versions of the model. E indicates that the model extends from the ground through exosphere and 00 is the year of release.

Over the years since introduction, NRLMSISE-00 has become the standard for international space research.

Input and output
The inputs for the model are:
 Year and day
 time of day
 geodetic altitude from 0 to 1,000 km
 geodetic latitude
 longitude
 local apparent solar time
 81-day average of F10.7 solar flux
 daily F10.7 solar flux for previous day
 Daily magnetic index

The outputs of the model are:
 Helium number density
 Oxygen (O) number density
 Oxygen (O2) number density
 Nitrogen (N) number density
 Nitrogen (N2) number density
 Argon (Ar) number density
 Hydrogen (H) number density
 total mass density
 Anomalous oxygen number density
 Exospheric temperature
 temperature at altitude

See also
 Static atmospheric model
 International Standard Atmosphere links to 1976 standard.

References

External links 
Publication
C and Fortran source code
MATLAB mex bridge
F90 source code
Java code in Orekit space dynamics library

Atmosphere of Earth
Government software